Rooms of the House is the third studio album by American post-hardcore band La Dispute, released on March 18, 2014 through their own label Better Living.

History
The album was written in a cabin in the Upper Peninsula of Michigan and recorded in Philadelphia, Pennsylvania, with producer Will Yip. The album was released with a 48-page companion book, Yesterday's Home, which was written about the process of making the album and includes all of the lyrics as well. Some of the proceeds from the record went to benefitting causes advancing and encouraging youth involvement in the arts and music, such as all-ages spaces, creative workshops, programming, and education. A tour was announced for Spring 2014 with Pianos Become the Teeth and Mansions. A national tour started on March 14, 2014 and ended on April 14, 2014 and an international tour started on April 27, 2014 and ended on May 22, 2014.

This release is the first without longtime supporters No Sleep Records, instead being released on their own label Better Living with help from Staple Records.

The album was included at number 42 on Rock Sounds "Top 50 Albums of the Year" list.

Track listing

Personnel
La Dispute
Jordan Dreyer – lead vocals, lyrics, percussion
Chad Sterenberg – guitar, synthesizer, percussion, backing vocals
Adam Vass – bass guitar, additional guitars, artwork, layout, backing vocals
Kevin Whittemore – guitar
Brad Vander Lugt – drums, percussion, keyboards

Additional personnel
Will Yip – engineer, mixing, producer
Amanda Adams – photography
La Dispute – producer
Emily Lazar – mastering
Rich Morales – mastering assistant
Adam Vass – artwork and layout

Charts

References
Citations

Sources

External links

2014 albums
La Dispute (band) albums
Albums produced by Will Yip